Jan Löwe  (born 14 July 1967) is a German molecular and structural biologist and the Director of the Medical Research Council (MRC) Laboratory of Molecular Biology (LMB) in Cambridge, UK. He became Director of the MRC-LMB in April 2018, succeeding Sir Hugh Pelham. Löwe is known for his contributions to the current understanding of bacterial cytoskeletons.

Education

Löwe was awarded a Diploma in Chemistry by the University of Hamburg in 1992. He was then awarded his Dr. rer. nat. in 1995 by the Technische Universität München, for his thesis work on the structure of the proteasome completed at the Max Planck Institute of Biochemistry under the supervision of Robert Huber.

Career and research
Löwe worked briefly as a postdoctoral researcher at the Max Planck Institute of Biochemistry, before moving to MRC-LMB in 1996 to take up an EMBO long-term fellowship to work on crystallising FtsZ, a bacterial homologue of eukaryotic tubulin, with Linda A. Amos. Löwe became a group leader at MRC-LMB in 1998 and was awarded tenure in 2002. His group has largely worked on the structural and molecular biology of prokaryotic cytoskeletons, but has also made important contributions to the current understanding of cell division and DNA partitioning in both prokaryotes and eukaryotes. Löwe became the Director of MRC-LMB in April 2018, having formerly been Deputy Director (2016-18) and Joint Head of the Structural Studies Division at the institute (2010-18).
In 2018, the title of Honorary Professor of Structural and Molecular Microbiology at the University of Cambridge was
conferred on him.

Awards and honours
1996 Otto-Hahn Medal of the Max Planck Society
2002 Leverhulme Prize for Biochemistry 
2004 Member, European Molecular Biology Organisation (EMBO)
2007 EMBO Gold Medal
2008 Elected a Fellow of the Royal Society (FRS)
2011 Wellcome Trust Senior Investigator Award
2012 Fellow at Darwin College, Cambridge
2013 Fellow of the German Academy of Sciences Leopoldina

References

British medical researchers
Fellows of Darwin College, Cambridge
Fellows of the Royal Society
Members of the European Molecular Biology Organization
Living people
1967 births
German molecular biologists